Sparaxis auriculata,  is a species of Sparaxis found in West Cape, South Africa.

References

External links
 
 

auriculata